Epimedium pubigerum, also known by the common name hairy barrenwort, is a species in the family Berberidaceae.

Description
Height: Reaches up to 45 cm at maturity.
Leaves: Heart-shaped, evergreen leaves are purplish bronze when young, turning dark glossy green with maturity.
Flowers: In spring, sprays of creamy white or pink flowers are held high above the leaves by their long stems.

Distribution and range
Epimedium pubigerum is native to southeastern Bulgaria and to the Transcaucasus region of Georgia, Armenia, and Azerbaijan.

Habitat and cultivation
Epimedium pubigerum prefers a sheltered position away from cold winds, and flourishes in the shady, fertile conditions of deciduous woodland.

References

Flora of Azerbaijan
Flora of Armenia
Flora of Bulgaria
Flora of Georgia (country)
pubigerum